Ahimsa (IAST: ahiṃsā) is the ancient Indian principle of nonviolence which applies to all living beings. It is a key virtue in Indian religions: Jainism, Buddhism, Hinduism, and Sikhism.

Ahimsa is one of the cardinal virtues of Jainism, where it is the first of the Pancha Mahavrata. It is also the first of the five precepts of Buddhism. Ahimsa is a multidimensional concept, inspired by the premise that all living beings have the spark of the divine spiritual energy; therefore, to hurt another being is to hurt oneself. Ahimsa is also related to the notion that all acts of violence have karmic consequences. While ancient scholars of Brahmanism already investigated and refined the principles of ahimsa, the concept reached an extraordinary development in the ethical philosophy of Jainism. Perhaps the most popular advocate of the principle of ahimsa in modern times was Mahatma Gandhi.

Ahimsa's precept that one living being should 'cause no injury' to another living being includes one's deeds, words, and thoughts. Classical Hindu texts like the Mahabharata and the Ramayana, as well as modern scholars, disagree about what the principles of Ahimsa dictate when one is faced with war and other situations which require self-defence. In this way, historical Indian literature has contributed to modern theories of just war and self-defence.

Etymology
The word Ahimsa—sometimes spelled Ahinsa—is derived from the Sanskrit root hiṃs, meaning to strike; hiṃsā is injury or harm, while a-hiṃsā (prefixed with the alpha privative), its opposite, is non-harming or nonviolence.

Origins
The idea of reverence for ahiṃsā exist in Hindu, Jain and Buddhist canonical texts. Parshvanatha preached ahimsa as one of the four vows in 9th century BCE. No other Indian religion has developed the non-violence doctrine and its implications on everyday life as has Jainism.

Hinduism

Ancient Vedic texts
Ahimsa as an ethical concept evolved in the Vedic texts. The oldest scriptures indirectly mention Ahimsa, but do not emphasize it. Over time, the Hindu scripts revise ritual practices and the concept of Ahimsa is increasingly refined and emphasized, until Ahimsa becomes the highest virtue by the late Vedic era (about 500 BCE). For example, hymn 10.22.25 in the Rig Veda uses the words Satya (truthfulness) and Ahimsa in a prayer to deity Indra; later, the Yajur Veda dated to be between 1000 BCE and 600 BCE, states, "may all beings look at me with a friendly eye, may I do likewise, and may we look at each other with the eyes of a friend".

The term Ahimsa appears in the text Taittiriya Shakha of the Yajurveda (TS 5.2.8.7), where it refers to non-injury to the sacrificer himself. It occurs several times in the Shatapatha Brahmana in the sense of "non-injury". The Ahimsa doctrine is a late Vedic era development in Brahmanical culture. The earliest reference to the idea of non-violence to animals (pashu-Ahimsa), apparently in a moral sense, is in the Kapisthala Katha Samhita of the Yajurveda (KapS 31.11), which may have been written in about the 8th century BCE.

Bowker states the word appears but is uncommon in the principal Upanishads. Kaneda gives examples of the word Ahimsa in these Upanishads. Other scholars suggest Ahimsa as an ethical concept that started evolving in the Vedas, becoming an increasingly central concept in Upanishads.

The Chāndogya Upaniṣad, dated to the 8th or 7th century BCE, one of the oldest Upanishads, has the earliest evidence for the Vedic era use of the word Ahimsa in the sense familiar in Hinduism (a code of conduct). It bars violence against "all creatures" (sarvabhuta) and the practitioner of Ahimsa is said to escape from the cycle of rebirths (CU 8.15.1). Some scholars state that this 8th or 7th century BCE mention may have been an influence of Jainism on Vedic Hinduism. Others scholar state that this relationship is speculative, and though Jainism is an ancient tradition the oldest traceable texts of Jainism tradition are from many centuries after the Vedic era ended.

Chāndogya Upaniṣad also names Ahimsa, along with Satyavacanam (truthfulness), Ārjavam (sincerity), Dānam (charity), Tapo (penance/meditation), as one of five essential virtues (CU 3.17.4).

The Sandilya Upanishad lists ten forbearances: Ahimsa, Satya, Asteya, Brahmacharya, Daya, Arjava, Kshama, Dhriti, Mitahara and Saucha. According to Kaneda, the term Ahimsa is an important spiritual doctrine shared by Hinduism, Buddhism and Jainism. It literally means 'non-injury' and 'non-killing'. It implies the total avoidance of harming of any kind of living creatures not only by deeds, but also by words and in thoughts.

The Epics
The Mahabharata, one of the epics of Hinduism, has multiple mentions of the phrase Ahimsa Paramo Dharma (अहिंसा परमॊ धर्मः), which literally means: non-violence is the highest moral virtue. For example, Anushasana Parva has the verse:
अहिंसा परमॊ धर्मः तथाहिंसा परॊ दमः।
अहिंसा परमं दानम् अहिंसा परमस तपः।
अहिंसा परमॊ यज्ञः तथाहिस्मा परं बलम्।
अहिंसा परमं मित्रम् अहिंसा परमं सुखम्।
अहिंसा परमं सत्यम् अहिंसा परमं श्रुतम्॥
The above passage from Mahabharata emphasises the cardinal importance of Ahimsa in Hinduism, and literally means:
Ahimsa is the highest Dharma, Ahimsa is the highest self-control, 
Ahimsa is the greatest gift, Ahimsa is the best practice, 
Ahimsa is the highest sacrifice, Ahimsa is the finest strength, 
Ahimsa is the greatest friend, Ahimsa is the greatest happiness, 
Ahimsa is the highest truth, and Ahimsa is the greatest teaching.Ahimsa: To do no harm  Subramuniyaswami, What is Hinduism?, Chapter 45, Pages 359–361
Some other examples where the phrase Ahimsa Paramo Dharma are discussed include Adi Parva, Vana Parva and Anushasana Parva. The Bhagavad Gita, among other things, discusses the doubts and questions about appropriate response when one faces systematic violence or war. These verses develop the concepts of lawful violence in self-defence and the theories of just war. However, there is no consensus on this interpretation. Gandhi, for example, considers this debate about non-violence and lawful violence as a mere metaphor for the internal war within each human being, when he or she faces moral questions.

Self-defence, criminal law, and war
The classical texts of Hinduism devote numerous chapters discussing what people who practice the virtue of Ahimsa, can and must do when they are faced with war, violent threat or need to sentence someone convicted of a crime. These discussions have led to theories of just war, theories of reasonable self-defence and theories of proportionate punishment. Arthashastra discusses, among other things, why and what constitutes proportionate response and punishment.

War
The precepts of Ahimsa under Hinduism require that war must be avoided, with sincere and truthful dialogue. Force must be the last resort. If war becomes necessary, its cause must be just, its purpose virtuous, its objective to restrain the wicked, its aim peace, its method lawful. War can only be started and stopped by a legitimate authority. Weapons used must be proportionate to the opponent and the aim of war, not indiscriminate tools of destruction. All strategies and weapons used in the war must be to defeat the opponent, not designed to cause misery to the opponent; for example, use of arrows is allowed, but use of arrows smeared with painful poison is not allowed. Warriors must use judgment in the battlefield. Cruelty to the opponent during war is forbidden. Wounded, unarmed opponent warriors must not be attacked or killed, they must be brought to your realm and given medical treatment. Children, women and civilians must not be injured. While the war is in progress, sincere dialogue for peace must continue.

Self-defence
In matters of self-defence, different interpretations of ancient Hindu texts have been offered. For example, Tähtinen suggests self-defence is appropriate, criminals are not protected by the rule of Ahimsa, and Hindu scriptures support the use of violence against an armed attacker. Ahimsa is not meant to imply pacifism.

Alternate theories of self-defence, inspired by Ahimsa, build principles similar to theories of just war. Aikido, pioneered in Japan, illustrates one such principles of self-defence. Morihei Ueshiba, the founder of Aikido, described his inspiration as Ahimsa. According to this interpretation of Ahimsa in self-defence, one must not assume that the world is free of aggression. One must presume that some people will, out of ignorance, error or fear, attack other persons or intrude into their space, physically or verbally. The aim of self-defence, suggested Ueshiba, must be to neutralise the aggression of the attacker, and avoid the conflict. The best defence is one where the victim is protected, as well as the attacker is respected and not injured if possible. Under Ahimsa and Aikido, there are no enemies, and appropriate self-defence focuses on neutralising the immaturity, assumptions and aggressive strivings of the attacker.

Criminal law
Tähtinen concludes that Hindus have no misgivings about the death penalty; their position is that evil-doers who deserve death should be killed, and that a king in particular is obliged to punish criminals and should not hesitate to kill them, even if they happen to be his own brothers and sons.

Other scholars conclude that the scriptures of Hinduism suggest sentences for any crime must be fair, proportional and not cruel.

Non-human life

The Hindu precept of "cause no injury" applies to animals and all life forms. This precept isn't found in the oldest verses of Vedas (1500–1000 BCE), but increasingly becomes one of the central ideas in post-Vedic period. In the oldest layer of the Vedas, such as the Rigveda, ritual sacrifices of animals and cooking of meat to feed guests are mentioned. This included goat, ox, horse and others. However, the text is not uniform in the prescriptive sense. Some verses praise meat as food, while other verses in the Vedas also recommend "abstention from meat", in particular, "beef". According to Marvin Harris, the Vedic literature is inconsistent, with some verses suggesting ritual slaughter and meat consumption, while others suggesting a taboo on meat-eating.

Hindu texts dated to 1st millennium BC, initially mention meat as food, then evolve to suggestions that only meat obtained through ritual sacrifice can be eaten, thereafter evolving to the stance that one should eat no meat because it hurts animals, with verses describing the noble life as one that lives on flowers, roots and fruits alone. The late Vedic era literature (pre-500 BCE) condemns all killings of men, cattle, birds and horses, and prays to god Agni to punish those who kill.

Later texts of Hinduism declare Ahimsa one of the primary virtues, declare any killing or harming any life as against dharma (moral life). Finally, the discussion in Upanishads and Hindu Epics shifts to whether a human being can ever live his or her life without harming animal and plant life in some way; which and when plants or animal meat may be eaten, whether violence against animals causes human beings to become less compassionate, and if and how one may exert least harm to non-human life consistent with ahimsa precept, given the constraints of life and human needs. The Mahabharata permits hunting by warriors, but opposes it in the case of hermits who must be strictly non-violent. Sushruta Samhita, a Hindu text written in the 3rd or 4th century, in Chapter XLVI suggests proper diet as a means of treating certain illnesses, and recommends various fishes and meats for different ailments and for pregnant women, and the Charaka Samhita describes meat as superior to all other kinds of food for convalescents.

Across the texts of Hinduism, there is a profusion of ideas about the virtue of Ahimsa when applied to non-human life, but without a universal consensus. Alsdorf claims the debate and disagreements between supporters of vegetarian lifestyle and meat eaters was significant. Even suggested exceptions – ritual slaughter and hunting – were challenged by advocates of Ahimsa. In the Mahabharata both sides present various arguments to substantiate their viewpoints. Moreover, a hunter defends his profession in a long discourse.

Many of the arguments proposed in favor of non-violence to animals refer to the bliss one feels, the rewards it entails before or after death, the danger and harm it prevents, as well as to the karmic consequences of violence.

The ancient Hindu texts discuss Ahimsa and non-animal life. They discourage wanton destruction of nature including of wild and cultivated plants. Hermits (sannyasins) were urged to live on a fruitarian diet so as to avoid the destruction of plants. Scholars claim the principles of ecological nonviolence is innate in the Hindu tradition, and its conceptual fountain has been Ahimsa as their cardinal virtue.

The classical literature of the Indian religions, such as Hinduism and Jainism, exists in many Indian languages. For example, the Tirukkural, written in three volumes, likely between 450 and 500 CE, dedicates verses 251–260 and 321–333 of its first volume to the virtue of Ahimsa, emphasizing on moral vegetarianism and non-killing (kollamai). However, the Tirukkural also glorifies soldiers and their valour during war, and states that it is king's duty to punish criminals and implement "death sentence for the wicked".

In 1960, H. Jay Dinshah founded the American Vegan Society (AVS), linking veganism to the concept of ahimsa.

Modern times

In the 19th and 20th centuries, prominent figures of Indian spirituality such as Shrimad Rajchandra and Swami Vivekananda emphasised the importance of Ahimsa.

Mohandas Karamchand Gandhi successfully promoted the principle of Ahimsa to all spheres of life, in particular to politics (Swaraj). His non-violent resistance movement satyagraha had an immense impact on India, impressed public opinion in Western countries, and influenced the leaders of various civil and political rights movements such as the American civil rights movement's Martin Luther King Jr. and James Bevel. In Gandhi's thought, Ahimsa precludes not only the act of inflicting a physical injury, but also mental states like evil thoughts and hatred, unkind behavior such as harsh words, dishonesty and lying, all of which he saw as manifestations of violence incompatible with Ahimsa. Gandhi believed Ahimsa to be a creative energy force, encompassing all interactions leading one's self to find satya, "Divine Truth". Sri Aurobindo criticised the Gandhian concept of Ahimsa as unrealistic and not universally applicable; he adopted a pragmatic non-pacifist position, saying that the justification of violence depends on the specific circumstances of the given situation.

Gandhi stated his belief that "Ahimsa is in Hinduism, it is in Christianity as well as in Islam." He added, "Nonviolence is common to all religions, but it has found the highest expression and application in Hinduism (I do not regard Jainism or Buddhism as separate from Hinduism)." When questioned whether violence and non-violence is both taught in Quran, he stated, "I have heard it from many Muslim friends that the Koran teaches the use of non-violence. (... The) argument about non-violence in the Holy Koran is an interpolation, not necessary for my thesis."

A historical and philosophical study of Ahimsa was instrumental in the shaping of Albert Schweitzer's principle of "reverence for life". Schweitzer praised Indian philosophical and religious traditions for the ethics of Ahimsa: "the laying down of the commandment not to kill and not to damage is one of the greatest events in the spiritual history of humankind", but suggested that "not-killing and not-harming" is not always practically possible as in self-defence, nor ethical as in chronic starving during a famine case.

Yoga
Ahimsa is imperative for practitioners of Patañjali's eight limb Raja yoga system. It is included in the first limb and is the first of five Yamas (self restraints) which, together with the second limb, make up the code of ethical conduct in Yoga philosophy. Ahimsa is also one of the ten Yamas in Hatha Yoga according to verse 1.1.17 of its classic manual Hatha Yoga Pradipika.
The significance of Ahimsa as the first restraint in the first limb of Yoga (Yamas), is that it defines the necessary foundation for progress through Yoga. It is a precursor to Asana, implying that success in Yogasana can be had only if the self is purified in thought, word, and deed through the self-restraint of Ahimsa.

Jainism

In Jainism, the understanding and implementation of Ahimsā is more radical, scrupulous, and comprehensive than in any other religion. Killing any living being out of passions is considered hiṃsā (to injure) and abstaining from such an act is ahimsā (noninjury). The vow of ahimsā is considered the foremost among the 'five vows of Jainism'. Other vows like truth (satya) are meant for safeguarding the vow of ahimsā. In the practice of Ahimsa, the requirements are less strict for the lay persons (sravakas) who have undertaken anuvrata (Smaller Vows) than for the Jain monastics who are bound by the Mahavrata "Great Vows". The statement  (or, "Non-injury/nonviolence/harmlessness is the supreme/ultimate/paramount/highest/absolute duty/virtue/attribute/religion" — slashes are used here to present alternative denotations) is often found inscribed on the walls of the Jain temples. Like in Hinduism, the aim is to prevent the accumulation of harmful karma. When Mahavira revived and reorganised the Jain faith in the 6th or 5th century BCE, Ahimsa was already an established, strictly observed rule. Rishabhanatha (Ādinātha), the first Jain Tirthankara, whom modern Western historians consider to be a historical figure, followed by Parshvanatha (Pārśvanātha) the twenty-third Tirthankara lived in about the 9th century BCE. He founded the community to which Mahavira's parents belonged. Ahimsa was already part of the "Fourfold Restraint" (Caujjama), the vows taken by Parshva's followers. In the times of Mahavira and in the following centuries, Jains were at odds with both Buddhists and followers of the Vedic religion or Hindus, whom they accused of negligence and inconsistency in the implementation of Ahimsa. According to the Jain tradition either lacto vegetarianism or veganism is prescribed.

The Jain concept of Ahimsa is characterised by several aspects. Killing of animals for food is absolutely ruled out. Jains also make considerable efforts not to injure plants in everyday life as far as possible. Though they admit that plants must be destroyed for the sake of food, they accept such violence only inasmuch as it is indispensable for human survival, and there are special instructions for preventing unnecessary violence against plants. Jain monks and nuns go out of their way so as not to hurt even small insects and other minuscule animals. Both the renouncers and the laypeople of Jain faith reject meat, fish, alcohol and honey as these are believed to harm large or minuscule life forms.

Jaina scholars have debated the potential injury to other life forms during one's occupation. Certain Jain texts, states Padmannabh Jaini – a Jainism scholar, forbid people of its faith from husbandry, agriculture and trade in animal-derived products. Some Jains abstain from farming because it inevitably entails unintentional killing or injuring of many small animals, such as worms and insects, These teachings, in part, have led the Jain community to focus on trade, merchant, clerical and administrative occupations to minimize arambhaja-himsa (occupational violence against all life forms). For the layperson, the teaching has been of ahimsa with pramada – that is, reducing violence through proper intention and being careful in every action on a daily basis to minimize violence to all life forms.

The Jain texts, unlike most Hindu and Buddhist texts on just war, have been inconsistent. For its monastic community – sadhu and sadhvi – the historically accepted practice has been to "willingly sacrifice one's own life" to the attacker, to not retaliate, so that the mendicant may keep the First Great Vow of "total nonviolence". Jain literature of the 10th century CE, for example, describes a king ready for war and being given lessons about non-violence by the Jain acharya (spiritual teacher). In the 12th century CE and thereafter, in an era of violent raids, destruction of temples, the slaughter of agrarian communities and ascetics by Islamic armies, Jain scholars reconsidered the First Great Vow of mendicants and its parallel for the laypeople. The medieval texts of this era, such as by Jinadatta Suri, recommended both the mendicants and the laypeople to fight and kill if that would prevent greater and continued violence on humans and other life forms (virodhi-himsa). Such exemptions to ahimsa is a relatively rare teaching in Jain texts, states Dundas.

Mahatma Gandhi stated, "No religion in the World has explained the principle of Ahiṃsā so deeply and systematically as is discussed with its applicability in every human life in Jainism. As and when the benevolent principle of Ahiṃsā or non-violence will be ascribed for practice by the people of the world to achieve their end of life in this world and beyond, Jainism is sure to have the uppermost status and Mahāvīra is sure to be respected as the greatest authority on Ahiṃsā".

Buddhism

In Buddhist texts Ahimsa (or its Pāli cognate ) is part of the Five Precepts, the first of which has been to abstain from killing. This precept of Ahimsa is applicable to both the Buddhist layperson and the monk community.

The Ahimsa precept is not a commandment and transgressions did not invite religious sanctions for laypersons, but their power has been in the Buddhist belief in karmic consequences and their impact in afterlife during rebirth. Killing, in Buddhist belief, could lead to rebirth in the hellish realm, and for a longer time in more severe conditions if the murder victim was a monk. Saving animals from slaughter for meat is believed to be a way to acquire merit for better rebirth. These moral precepts have been voluntarily self-enforced in lay Buddhist culture through the associated belief in karma and rebirth. The Buddhist texts not only recommended Ahimsa, but suggest avoiding trading goods that contribute to or are a result of violence:

Unlike lay Buddhists, transgressions by monks do invite sanctions. Full expulsion of a monk from sangha follows instances of killing, just like any other serious offense against the monastic nikaya code of conduct.

War
Violent ways of punishing criminals and prisoners of war were not explicitly condemned in Buddhism, but peaceful ways of conflict resolution and punishment with the least amount of injury were encouraged. The early texts condemn the mental states that lead to violent behavior.

Nonviolence is an overriding theme within the Pāli Canon. While the early texts condemn killing in the strongest terms, and portray the ideal queen/king as a pacifist, such a queen/king is nonetheless flanked by an army. It seems that the Buddha's teaching on nonviolence was not interpreted or put into practice in an uncompromisingly pacifist or anti-military-service way by early Buddhists. The early texts assume war to be a fact of life, and well-skilled warriors are viewed as necessary for defensive warfare. In Pali texts, injunctions to abstain from violence and involvement with military affairs are directed at members of the sangha; later Mahayana texts, which often generalise monastic norms to laity, require this of lay people as well.

The early texts do not contain just-war ideology as such. Some argue that a sutta in the Gamani Samyuttam rules out all military service. In this passage, a soldier asks the Buddha if it is true that, as he has been told, soldiers slain in battle are reborn in a heavenly realm. The Buddha reluctantly replies that if he is killed in battle while his mind is seized with the intention to kill, he will undergo an unpleasant rebirth. In the early texts, a person's mental state at the time of death is generally viewed as having a great impact on the next birth.

Some Buddhists point to other early texts as justifying defensive war. One example is the Kosala Samyutta, in which King Pasenadi, a righteous king favored by the Buddha, learns of an impending attack on his kingdom. He arms himself in defence, and leads his army into battle to protect his kingdom from attack. He lost this battle but won the war. King Pasenadi eventually defeated King Ajātasattu and captured him alive. He thought that, although this King of Magadha has transgressed against his kingdom, he had not transgressed against him personally, and Ajātasattu was still his nephew. He released Ajātasattu and did not harm him. Upon his return, the Buddha said (among other things) that Pasenadi "is a friend of virtue, acquainted with virtue, intimate with virtue", while the opposite is said of the aggressor, King Ajātasattu.

According to Theravada commentaries, there are five requisite factors that must all be fulfilled for an act to be both an act of killing and to be karmically negative. These are: (1) the presence of a living being, human or animal; (2) the knowledge that the being is a living being; (3) the intent to kill; (4) the act of killing by some means; and (5) the resulting death. Some Buddhists have argued on this basis that the act of killing is complicated, and its ethicality is predicated upon intent. Some have argued that in defensive postures, for example, the primary intention of a soldier is not to kill, but to defend against aggression, and the act of killing in that situation would have minimal negative karmic repercussions.

According to Dr. Babasaheb Ambedkar, there is circumstantial evidence encouraging Ahimsa, from the Buddha's doctrine, "Love all, so that you may not wish to kill any." Gautama Buddha distinguished between a principle and a rule. He did not make Ahimsa a matter of rule, but suggested it as a matter of principle. This gives Buddhists freedom to act.

Laws
The emperors of the Sui dynasty, Tang dynasty, and early Song dynasty banned killing in the Lunar calendar's 1st, 5th, and 9th months. Empress Wu Tse-Tien banned killing for more than half a year in 692. Some rulers banned fishing for a period of time each year.

There were also bans after the death of emperors, after Buddhist and Taoist prayers, and after natural disasters such as Shanghai's 1926 summer drought, as well as an 8-day ban beginning August 12, 1959, after the August 7 flood (八七水災), the last big flood before the 88 Taiwan Flood.

People avoid killing during some festivals, like the Taoist Ghost Festival, the Nine Emperor Gods Festival, and the Vegetarian Festival, as well as during others.

See also

Anekantavada
Animal rights
Consistent life ethic
Ethics
Golden Rule
Human rights
Nonkilling
Nonviolence
Nonresistance
Pacifism
Yamas
Karuṇā
Civil resistance
Gandhism
Satyagraha
Veganism
Vegetarianism and religion
History of vegetarianism

References

Citations

Sources

Jindal, K.B.: An epitome of Jainism, New Delhi 1988 
Laidlaw, James: Riches and Renunciation. Religion, economy, and society among the Jains, Oxford 1995 
Lamotte, Etienne: History of Indian Buddhism from the Origins to the Śaka Era, Louvain-la-Neuve 1988 

Mohandas Karamchand Gandhi: Manas: History and Politics, 2 October 1869 – 30 January 1948)

Sarao, K.T.S.: The Origin and Nature of Ancient Indian Buddhism, Delhi 1989
Schmidt, Hanns Peter: The Origin of Ahimsa, in: Mélanges d'Indianisme à la mémoire de Louis Renou, Paris 1968
 

 
Attribution:

External links

 
  Series of Lectures on Ahimsa
 

Concepts in ethics
Hindu philosophical concepts
Hindu ethics
Jain philosophical concepts
Jain ethics
Buddhist ethics
Pacifism
Sanskrit words and phrases
Wholesome factors in Buddhism